This is list of elections in Canada in 2001. Included are provincial, municipal and  federal elections, by-elections on any level, referendums and party leadership races at any level.

March
12: 2001 Alberta general election

May
14: New Brunswick municipal elections & 2001 New Brunswick video lottery terminal referendum
16: 2001 British Columbia provincial election

October
15: 2001 Alberta municipal elections

November
3: 2001 Green Party of Ontario leadership election
4: 2001 Quebec municipal elections

See also
Municipal elections in Canada
Elections in Canada